"My Way" is a 1969 song popularized by Frank Sinatra.

My Way may also refer to:

Film and television
My Way (1973 film), a South African film directed by Emil Nofal
My Way, a 1974 film directed by Kaneto Shindo
My Way (2011 film), a South Korean war film by Kang Je-gyu
My Way (2012 film) or Cloclo, a French biographical film about Claude François
My Way: The Rise and Fall of Silvio Berlusconi, a 2016 documentary narrated by Alan Friedman
"My Way" (Phil of the Future), a television episode

Music

Albums
My Way (Akufen album) or the title song, 2002
My Way (Billy Eckstine album) or the title song, 1966
My Way (Eddie Cochran album) or the title song (see below), 1964
My Way (Frank Sinatra album) or the title song (see top), 1969
My Way: The Best of Frank Sinatra, 1997
My Way (Gene Ammons album), 1971
My Way (Herman Brood album), 2001
My Way (Ian Brown album), 2009
My Way (Lady Saw album) or the title song, 2010
My Way (Lester Bowie album), 1990
My Way (M. Pokora album), 2016
My Way (Major Harris album), 1975
My Way (EP), by Rage, 2016
My Way (Shirley Kwan album), 1994
My Way (Usher album) or the title song (see below), 1997
My Way (Willie Nelson album), 2018
My Way, by Air, 2002
My Way, by Hins Cheung, 2002
My Way, by Ngô Thanh Vân, 2005
My Way, by Paul Jones, 1966
My Way, by Skazi, 2012

Songs
"My Way" (Calvin Harris song), 2016
"My Way" (Eddie Cochran song), 1963
"My Way" (Fetty Wap song), 2015
"My Way" (Limp Bizkit song), 2001
"My Way" (Usher song), 1998
"My Way: Ulala", by Dream, 2010
"My Way", by Aaron Pritchett from Something Goin' On Here, 2003
"My Way", by Alien Beat Club, 2009
"My Way", by Ava Max, 2018
"My Way", by Bone Thugs from New Waves, 2017
"My Way", by Butch Walker from Left of Self-Centered, 2002
"My Way", by Def Tech, 2004
"My Way", by Kiss from Crazy Nights, 1987
"My Way", by Los Lonely Boys from Sacred, 2006
"My Way", by Noah Cyrus and One Bit, 2017
"My Way", by Rage from The Devil Strikes Again, 2016
"My Way", by Thandi Phoenix, 2018
"My Way", by Tyga, 2017

Other uses
MyWay (ticketing system), a contactless public transport ticketing system in Canberra, Australia
MyWay Searchbar or MyWay Speedbar or MyWay Search Assistant, a computer browser hijacker
My Way Film Company Limited, a Hong Kong film production and distribution company
My Way, a 1981 autobiography by Robert Muldoon
MyWay Airlines, an airline based in Tbilisi, Georgia